Abang Nor Sillmy bin Abang Haji Taha (born 11 August 1978) is a Bruneian footballer who plays for Ar Rawda FC of the Brunei-Muara District League. He was a member of the Brunei national representative team for the Malaysian league that won the 1999 Malaysia Cup. He is a versatile player who has played at various positions throughout his career.

Club career

Brunei
Initially a central defender, Norsillmy was a relative newcomer to the Brunei squad that was competing in the Malaysian M-League in 1999, coached by Englishman David Booth. Although they finished seventh in Premier One, they began a hot streak in the subsequent Malaysia Cup campaign which concluded with winning the silverware, Brunei's first in 20 years of participation. Norsillmy played in that final, a 2-1 victory over Sarawak hosted at the Merdeka Stadium in Kuala Lumpur.

Due to the restriction of import players in the following season, then coach Mick Jones started to place Norsillmy in attack, complimenting the diminutive Riwandi Wahit in a little-and-large combination. Both of them only managed to score five goals each as the lack of foreign firepower condemned Brunei to the foot of the table and relegation to Premier Two.

Norsillmy stayed with the Wasps until the 2004 season, scoring 22 goals in the role of a striker.

Later career

Norsillmy played for Wijaya FC in the domestic B-League, winning the 2002 FA Cup and the 2003 championship. In fact, he scored the solitary winning goal against MS ABDB in the first FA Cup final. He left Wijaya for Jerudong FC in 2009, then accepted an invitation to train and possibly play for Brunei's professional club DPMM FC in late 2011, in view of the 2012 S.League. Despite putting pen to paper on a professional contract, he unfortunately failed the mandatory fitness test required by the S.League and failed to make his debut for the Gegar Gegar men.

Norsillmy joined ambitious Majra FC at the start of the 2012-13 Brunei Super League and finished third in the new league. He moved to Najip FC in the following season, one of several big names to join the club that did not gain a single point the season before. His brief but fruitful stay led Najip FC to third-place in the league as well as an FA Cup final appearance.

Norsillmy dropped a division in 2015, joining Kota Ranger FC in the Brunei Premier League, and finished in first place unbeaten. Promotion to the 2016 Brunei Super League ensued, and he scored five goals to finish second in the goalscoring charts, despite his club only managing a sixth-place finish.

International career

Norsillmy made his international debut for the Brunei national team on 2 August 1999 against Cambodia in a 3-3 draw at the 20th SEA Games hosted by his home country. He gained 14 caps for the Wasps, his final tournament being the 2004 AFC Asian Cup qualification games against Maldives and Myanmar in March 2003.

Honours

Team
Brunei 
Malaysia Cup: 1999
Wijaya FC
B-League: 2003
Brunei FA Cup: 2002
Brunei Super Cup: 2003
Kota Ranger
Brunei Premier League: 2015

Individual
 
  Meritorius Service Medal (PJK) (1999)

Personal life 
Norsillmy's brother, Nor Hillmy Taha is a football coach who is head coach for Deno FC. His nephew Abang Nur Hilman bin Abang Nor Hillmy is a Bruneian youth international who plays for Kota Ranger FC.

Norsillmy works at the Survey Department at the Ministry of Development of Brunei.

References

External links
 
 

1987 births
Living people
Association football forwards
Bruneian footballers
Brunei international footballers
Brunei (Malaysia Premier League team) players
DPMM FC players
Competitors at the 1999 Southeast Asian Games
Southeast Asian Games competitors for Brunei